The Communist Party of Germany (Red Dawn) was a minor communist political party in Germany.

It was founded in December 1985 in Hamburg by members of the Communist Party of Germany/Marxists-Leninists who disapproved of that group's fusion with the Trotskyist "Gruppe Internationale Marxisten", seeing it as betrayal of their Hoxhaist ideology.

The party published its own monthly newspaper Roter Morgen until its dissolution in 2011.

Roter Oktober 

Red October - Organisation for the construction of a Communist Party in Germany, short form: RO, split from the KPD (Red Dawn) in December 2002 due to viewing their predecessor as false communists. The organisation itself wasn't a political party, but rather an association of communists with the eventual goal of constructing a vanguardist party able to bring about the dictatorship of the proletariat.

Red October dissolved in 2009, stating their goal for the construction of a real communist party in Germany to have failed.

References

External links

1985 establishments in Germany
Communist parties in Germany
Außerparlamentarische Opposition
Hoxhaist parties
International Conference of Marxist–Leninist Parties and Organizations (Unity & Struggle)
Political parties established in 1985